The Tulsa Botanic Garden is a  botanical garden under development at 3900 Tulsa Botanic Drive, approximately  northwest of downtown Tulsa, in Osage County, Oklahoma. It is located at the intersection of N 52 W Avenue and W 43 Street N. The mission of Tulsa Botanic Garden is to promote the beauty and importance of plants and nature to create a more sustainable and harmonious world. 

Dr. F. Todd Lasseigne, a noted horticulturalist, was the first full-time President and Chief Executive Officer of the Garden and held the position from April 2011 to August 2020. Prior to his appointment in 2011, he was Executive Director of Paul J. Ciener Botanical Garden (Kernersville, North Carolina) from 2005 through early 2011. Before that, he was Assistant Director of the JC Raulston Arboretum (Raleigh, North Carolina).  Chuck Lamson, former owner of the Tulsa Drillers baseball team, became President and Chief Executive Officer in January 2021.

History
The project was first conceived in 1999, and called the Oklahoma Centennial Botanical Garden Research and Education Center (OCBG). Pat Woodrum became Executive Director in 2003. In 2004, Persimmon Ridge, LLC donated  of land for the Garden site. The Oklahoma Centennial Commission awarded grants totaling $2.2 million to the OCBG in 2006 to begin construction on the site. The Assistant Principal Chief of the Osage Nation conducted a Blessing of the Land ceremony for the garden in 2007. 

A  lake and  visitor center were dedicated in 2008, and opened to the public in 2009. F. Todd Lasseigne was named to run the garden in 2011. In 2013, some 1,200 plants were added, and the facility was renamed as the Tulsa Botanic Garden (TBG).  Development continued during the following winter in preparation for the garden's April 2014 reopening.

Construction of water and electric mains to the TBG was completed during the summer of 2014. Previously, the facility had to truck in water and use a portable propane generator to supply electricity. This structure will shelter plants that can not be grown in full sunlight. The center plans to build an indoor structure of the same size. Staff offices, which have been in the Harwelden mansion, will move to the center in the fall of 2014.

The Garden announced progress on their first capital campaign, titled ""Reaching for Generations,” on October 2, 2014.  The campaign, whose goal is to raise $17 million, will fund the construction of four gardens: The A.R. and Marylouise Tandy Floral Terraces will be a formal garden, set on four acres, that will showcase colors and textures throughout the season, using ornamental plants including perennials, shrubs and bulbs. The Children’s Discovery Garden is designed as a “wonderland” environment to provide experience-based learning for children and families. The Lotus Pool will highlight aquatic plants, like lotus and water lilies, and be surrounded by the circular All Seasons Garden that will be filled with plants throughout the year.

Groundbreaking for the  A.R. and Marylouise Tandy Floral Terraces was Thursday, November 13, 2014. The $3 million project opened to the public on October 3, 2015.

The Children's Discovery Garden opened on May 15, 2016. 

The Gardens host an annual Garden Of Lights festival "Garden Of Lights", which is an event that has been hosted since the winter of 2018.

Notes

References

External links
Tulsa Botanic Garden official website
Timeline of Tulsa Botanic Garden
Information on Garden Of Lights
Additional Timeline of the TBG

Botanical gardens in Oklahoma
Protected areas of Osage County, Oklahoma
Geography of Tulsa, Oklahoma
Tourist attractions in Tulsa, Oklahoma